Vladyslav Ruslanovych Khamelyuk (born 4 May 1998) is a Ukrainian professional football player who plays for LNZ Cherkasy.

Club career
He made his Ukrainian Premier League debut for FC Chornomorets Odesa on 17 March 2018 in a game against FC Stal Kamianske.

On 9 February 2022 Khamelyuk signed with Dynamo Brest in Belarus. In early March 2022 the player terminated contract, before playing any official matches.

References

External links

1998 births
Living people
People from Kamianets-Podilskyi
Sportspeople from Khmelnytskyi Oblast
Ukrainian footballers
Association football midfielders
FC Metalurh Zaporizhzhia players
FC Chornomorets Odesa players
FC Olimpik Donetsk players
FC Lviv players
FC Dynamo Brest players
FK Jonava players
FC LNZ Cherkasy players
Ukrainian Premier League players
Ukrainian First League players
Ukraine youth international footballers
Ukrainian expatriate footballers
Expatriate footballers in Belarus
Ukrainian expatriate sportspeople in Belarus
Expatriate footballers in Lithuania
Ukrainian expatriate sportspeople in Lithuania